Team jumping equestrian at the 2018 Asian Games was held in Jakarta International Equestrian Park, Jakarta, Indonesia on 27 and 28 August 2018. This was the eighth appearance of this event since its debut at the Asian Games in 1986 in Seoul.  Japan has won a record of 4 gold medals, followed by Saudi Arabia with 2 gold medals, and Qatar with one gold medal.

Saudi Arabia team won the gold medal, followed by Japan and Qatar who claimed the silver and bronze medals respectively.

Schedule
All times are Western Indonesia Time (UTC+07:00)

Results 
Legend
EL — Eliminated
RT — Retired
WD — Withdrawn

Qualifier

Final

References

External links
 Official website

Team jumping